Ruënna "Sugar" Mercelina (born January 18, 1992) is a Dutch Caribbean model, beauty queen and actress. She has appeared on the covers of the GO Weekly Magazine and Dolfijn FM Magazine.

She is the former titleholder of the Miss Caraibes Hibiscus Curaçao and the winner of the Best in Evening Gown category. She is also the former Miss Teenager Curaçao, where she won the Miss Teenager Universe Congeniality Award.

Early life 

Ruënna was born in the St. Elizabeth Hospital to parent Ruthsella Mercelina-Troncon and Gwendell Mercelina Sr. She was raised in a Roman Catholic home. Her brother, Gwendell Mercelina Jr., is four years older and is a media personality and politician in Curaçao, an international youth ambassador, and was the former Youth Parliament President of Curaçao.

In her earlier years she attended Johan van Walbeeck Kindergarten and Elementary school, and then the Albert Schweitzer High School.

She completed her Marketing & Public Relations degree at the College of the Dutch Caribbean and is now majoring at the University of Curaçao in Education.

Career

Modeling & pageantry
At 12 years old she was discovered by local agent Mrs. Emilka Eustachia from A2Z Models and started modeling while attending school. Later she participated in the Miss Curaçao Teenager pageant and fashion shows of the former Curaçao Beauty Organization of Mr. Aubrey America. She also worked in the organization's Model Image division as a model instructor for children and pre-teens.

In her first beauty pageant she won the titles of Miss Curaçao Teenager Talent, Most Beautiful Legs, Miss Internet, and was given the title of Miss Kitatin (Kitalin being the most popular Dutch Caribbean online media community). At the Miss Ecstasy International in Anguilla she won the Miss Personality award, and won the Miss Caribbean Talented Teen in St. Kitts and Nevis.

She has appeared on the covers of magazines such as 4 You-th  and has featured in advertising campaigns for companies such as Albert Heijn, Fun Miles, Maduro & Curiel's Bank (MCB) and Post Spaarbank.

In 2008 Mercelina won the title of Miss Teenager Curaçao 2008. In Guatemala, the Minister of Culture called her the Ebony Goddess. 

She became the Miss University & College of the Dutch Caribbean in 2010 and represented the university in the national colleges and high schools competition during Carnival season in the national Teen King & Queen election.

In 2010 Mercelina was a finalist for Miss Caraïbes Hibiscus.

In 2011 Mercelina was voted Miss Teenager Congeniality at the 2011 staging of Miss Teenager.

In 2013 Mercelina was selected as Curaçao’s Tourism Queen 2013, and was also the one who inducted the 2013 Curaçao’s Grand Carnival Parades. As an ambassador to the island of Curaçao, she served in neighbor island Aruba together with Venezuelan celebrities Leonardo Villalobos of "Super Sabado Sensacional" and actress Carolina Perpetuo, as judge for the Aruba’s 59th Carnival Queen and 19th Mrs. Carnival Queen.

In 2013 she was also voted National Carnival Queen and was the first person to win seven out of the eight titles in the National Carnival Queen Election.

Curaçao International Film Festival Rotterdam

Ruënna served as hostess of the First Inaugural Curaçao International Film Festival Rotterdam. The first film festival of such magnitude and scope that ever took place on Curaçao. More than 25 films and 11 ‘shorts’ were screened in the new six-screen multiplex theater The Cinemas, located in the Otrobanda district of Willemstad, over a four-day period (was held from March 29 to April 1, 2012.)

Acting
She played the lead role In the comedy "Gainan Fini" as a female writer who transforms into a homosexual man to write a book of the "gay community" life. She is also an actress in the international production company Endemol’s Dutch Caribbean youth soap-series "Ki bo Ke Men?" (What do you mean?).

In 2012 she played "Tisha". the lead role of a fifteen-year-old girl who must choose whether to go through an unplanned pregnancy. The play, which was aimed to teens in the Dutch Caribbean and the Dutch Kingdom, explores issues such as tradition, sexual morality and personal choice. The play was written by Albert Schoobaar, who also wrote  "Deconstruction of Edsel K.". Tisha was produced by Teatro KadaKen. The play ran from March to November 2012 at the youth theatre "La Tentashon" in Willemstad, Curaçao.

Philanthropy

On August 12, 2010, Ruënna Mercelina co-founded the WE LEAD Foundation, where she acts as an ambassador. The foundation aims to develop leadership and nation-building skills.

References

External links

 Sugar Official Website
 Sugar Official Facebook Page
 Official Agent
 Miss Caraïbes Hibiscus Curacao Facebook
 Miss Caraïbes Hibiscus Official Site

1992 births
Curaçao beauty pageant winners
Living people
20th-century Dutch actresses
21st-century Dutch actresses
People from Willemstad
Dutch film actresses
Dutch female models
Dutch television actresses
Dutch television personalities
Dutch public relations people
Curaçao entertainers